The Drexel Plasma Institute, in Camden, New Jersey, is the largest university-based plasma research facility in the United States of America. Led by Drexel University, the members of the scientific team are from  University of Illinois at Chicago, Argonne National Laboratory, Pacific Northwest National Laboratory and Kurchatov Institute of Atomic Energy. The primary fields of research are applications in medicine, Environmental Control, energy, and agricultural industries. The institute actively develops and researches specific types of plasma discharges such as gliding arc, dielectric barrier discharge, gliding arc tornado, reverse vortex flow, Pulsed Corona Discharge, and many more.

Applications 
Many applications of plasma can be utilized in many industries. As such, its application is often categorized in the context of its research. For example, the dissociation of hydrogen sulfide can be labeled as an environmental application. However, its production of gaseous hydrogen can be more relevant to the energy industry. As such, it is categorized on its researched application, rather than its objective goal.

Medicine 

Dr. Gregory Fridman is the laboratory director regarding the application of plasma in the field of medicine.  Along with teaching at Drexel University, he creates and finds new applications of plasma in medicine such as blood coagulation.

Environmental control

Energy 
Alexander Rabinovich is the laboratory director regarding the application of plasma in the field of energy. Primarily, he studies and researches how plasma can be used in the Energy Systems, Fuel Conversion & Hydrogen Production Division. Some of his research is specialized in conversion of certain gases or the dissociation of others:

 "Gliding Arc Plasma-Stimulated Conversion of Pyrogas into Synthesis Gas" 
 "Low-Temperature Plasma Reforming of Hydrocarbon Fuels Into Hydrogen and Carbon Suboxide for Energy Generation Without CO2 Emission"
 "Plasma assisted dissociation of hydrogen sulfide"

Agriculture

References

Plasma physics facilities
Research institutes in New Jersey
Drexel University
Education in Camden, New Jersey
Organizations established in 2002
2002 establishments in New Jersey